is a noted Japanese professor, poet, and novelist.

Life
Matsuura was born in Tokyo. In 1981 he obtained his Ph.D. in French literature from the University of Paris III: Sorbonne Nouvelle, and 1982 became an assistant professor in the French Department at the University of Tokyo where he is now a professor of culture and representation. He was supported by a 1997–98 Japan Foundation Fellowship at Harvard University.

Awards
Matsuura has received a number of awards for his literary work, including a 2000 Akutagawa Prize for Hana kutashi (A Spoiling Rain), and the 2004 Yomiuri Prize for Hantō (The Peninsula). His serialized novel Kawa no Hikari (River's Light) has been adapted into an anime television special.

Works in English translation
Novel
Triangle (original title: Tomoe), trans. David Karashima (Dalkey Archive Press, 2014)

Selected academic works 
 "A Comparative Study on Images of 'Modernity'", The Japan Foundation Newsletter XXVI/No. 1, pages 7–8.
 Electronic Realism, translated by Indra Levy.
 The Memory of the Extra-Filmic: Preservation and Access to Materials for the Future of Film Studies

External links 
 University of Tokyo: Hisaki Matsuura page
 Hisaki Matsuura at J'Lit Books from Japan 
 Synopsis of Triangle (Tomoe) at JLPP (Japanese Literature Publishing Project) 
 Japanese Wikipedia article
 Hisaki Matsuura and Moyez Vassanji Interviews
 Dennitza Gabrakova, "The Semi-space of Life and the Illusion of Depth - Matsuura Hisaki's Peninsula", Japanese Studies, Volume 29, Issue 3 December 2009, pages 367-379.

References

1954 births
20th-century Japanese novelists
21st-century Japanese novelists
Japanese poets
Living people
Academic staff of the University of Tokyo
University of Tokyo alumni
Akutagawa Prize winners
Yukio Mishima Prize winners
Yomiuri Prize winners
International Writing Program alumni